755 Quintilla (prov. designation:  or ) is a metallic background asteroid from the outer regions of the asteroid belt, approximately  in diameter. It was discovered on 6 April 1908, by American astronomer Joel Metcalf at the Taunton Observatory  in Massachusetts, United States. For its size, the M-type asteroid has a relatively short rotation period of 4.55 hours. It was named Quintilla, an Italian female first name, for no reason other than being the first asteroid name beginning with the letter "Q".

Orbit and classification 

Quintilla is a non-family asteroid of the main belt's background population when applying the hierarchical clustering method to its proper orbital elements. It orbits the Sun in the outer asteroid belt at a distance of 2.7–3.6 AU once every 5 years and 8 months (2,073 days; semi-major axis of 3.18 AU). Its orbit has an eccentricity of 0.14 and an inclination of 3° with respect to the ecliptic. The body's observation arc begins at Vienna Observatory on 1 September 1915, almost 7 years after its official discovery observation by Joel Metcalf at Taunton.

Naming 

This minor planet was named Quintilla, a name of an Italian first name, that was proposed by Arville D. Walker, secretary to the American astronomer and director of Harvard Observatory Harlow Shapley (1885–1972), as no other asteroid name began with the letter "Q" when it was named in 1926. The  was mentioned in The Names of the Minor Planets by Paul Herget in 1955.

Physical characteristics 

In the Tholen classification, Quintilla is a metallic M-type asteroid.

Rotation period 

Several rotational lightcurves of Quintilla were obtained from photometric observations. In November 2018, Michael and Matthew Fauerbach obtained a period of  hours and an amplitude of  magnitude.

Diameter and albedo 

The Collaborative Asteroid Lightcurve Link derives an albedo of 0.1781 and a diameter of 36.16 kilometers based on an absolute magnitude of 9.7.

References

External links 
 Lightcurve Database Query (LCDB), at www.minorplanet.info
 Dictionary of Minor Planet Names, Google books
 Asteroids and comets rotation curves, CdR – Geneva Observatory, Raoul Behrend
 Discovery Circumstances: Numbered Minor Planets (1)-(5000) – Minor Planet Center
 
 

000755
Discoveries by Joel Hastings Metcalf
Named minor planets
000755
19080406